The Charlotte 49ers football statistical leaders are individual statistical leaders of the Charlotte 49ers football program in various categories, including passing, rushing, receiving, total offense, defensive stats, and kicking. Within those areas, the lists identify single-game, single season and career leaders. The 49ers represent the University of North Carolina at Charlotte in the NCAA Division I FBS Conference USA through the 2022 season, after which Charlotte will join the American Athletic Conference.

Charlotte, then a 2-year college called the Charlotte Center of the University of North Carolina, played 3 years of intercollegiate football from 1946 through 1948. Records from this period are intermittent, and therefore player statistics from those seasons are not included on the lists below. Charlotte restated its football program in 2013. These statistics are updated through the end of the 2020 season.

All statistics are as recorded as of the end of the 2021 football season.

Passing

Passing yards

Passing touchdowns

Rushing

Rushing yards

Rushing touchdowns

Receiving

Receptions

Receiving yards

Receiving touchdowns

Total offense
Total offense is the sum of passing and rushing statistics. It does not include receiving or returns.

Total offense yards

Touchdowns responsible for
"Touchdowns responsible for" is the NCAA's official term for combined passing and rushing touchdowns.

Defense

Interceptions

Tackles

Sacks

Kicking

Field goals made

Field goal percentage

References

Lists of college football statistical leaders by team